Five Channels Dam is a hydro-electric dam on the Au Sable River in Michigan.

Background
Consumers Power Company (now Consumers Energy) began construction on this hydro-electric dam in 1911 and completed it in 1912.  The dam, the second of six built by the company on the Au Sable River, is named for the nearby location where there were once five distinct river channels. The current plant is capable of producing 6,000 kilowatts.

Five Channels Dam worker's camp
During construction of the dam, the company tried to provide a healthy environment for workers by incorporating lessons learned on worker safety and health during construction of Panama Canal. They built a 45-acre camp for workers and their families, complete with a central water supply and sewage system, icehouse, school, washroom, store and boardinghouse.  The workers also received land on which to build a house; the resulting structures ranged clapboard houses to log cabins to tarpaper shacks to tents. At the completion of dam construction, the worker's camp buildings were moved to the next construction site (the Loud Dam) or razed. The site of the workers' camp built to support construction of the dam was listed as an archaeological site (designated 20ES112, 20IS113, 20IS114, 20IS115, and 20IS116) on the National Register of Historic Places on March 13, 2002.

References

Dams in Michigan
Hydroelectric power plants in Michigan
Dams on the National Register of Historic Places in Michigan
Buildings and structures in Iosco County, Michigan
Consumers Energy dams
Dams completed in 1912
Energy infrastructure completed in 1912
1912 establishments in Michigan
Historic districts on the National Register of Historic Places in Michigan
National Register of Historic Places in Iosco County, Michigan